John Reily (1763-1850) was a soldier in the American Revolution who later held a number of civic positions including helping draft the Ohio State Constitution. Reily Township in Butler County, Ohio is named for him.

Biography
John Reily was born in Chester County, Pennsylvania on April 10, 1763, and moved with his parents to Augusta County, Virginia when young.

From the age of 17, Reily served in the Revolutionary War, including the Battle of Camden, the Battle of Guilford Court House, and the Battle of Eutaw Springs.

After the  War, Reily moved to Kentucky. In 1790 he moved to Columbia, (now a neighborhood of Cincinnati) to build John Reily's Classical School and became its first school teacher. It was one of the first schools in the territory. The school grew and he soon hired a second teacher, Francis Dunlavy.

In 1799, he was elected clerk of the Legislature of the Northwest Territory, and re-elected to that position in 1800 and 1801. In 1802 he was elected as one of the seven trustees of the new town of Cincinnati. Later that year he was a representative at the Constitutional Convention that drafted Ohio's first Constitution. In 1802 he was also one of the first subscribers who purchased shares to start the Cincinnati Library, one of the first libraries in the state.

He moved to Hamilton, Ohio, and was elected the first Clerk of Court for Butler County by the associate judges of the court of common pleas, a position to which he was re-elected for 37 years. He was concurrently appointed as clerk for the supreme court of Butler County, a position which he also maintained until 1842. He was also a long time Postmaster of Hamilton, and he served as County Recorder from 1803-1811. At first he worked from a small building outside the old fort at Hamilton, before moving the offices to his home, and in 1824 to the newly built court house.

Reily was appointed as one of the first trustees of Miami University, and was president of the board of trustees until 1824.

In 1808 he married Nancy Hunter. The Reilys had two daughters and three sons, one of whom, Robert, founded the town of Wyoming, Ohio.

Reily died in Hamilton  June 7, 1850.

Legacy
In 1807, a new township was formed by in Butler County by splitting the existing St. Clair Township. The new township was named Reily Township after John Reily.

In his positions as clerk, Reily used high quality materials. The materials, combined with his "bold" character strokes meant that his hand-written records from the early 1800s were still clearly legible in the early 1900s.

Notes

References

1763 births
1850 deaths
People from Hamilton, Ohio
Founders of educational institutions
People from Chester County, Pennsylvania
County officials in Ohio
Continental Army officers from Pennsylvania
Miami University trustees
Ohio Constitutional Convention (1802)
Ohio postmasters
Virginia militiamen in the American Revolution
Ohio Federalists
People of colonial Pennsylvania
Schoolteachers from Ohio